The Lick Skillet Railroad Work Station Historic District is a historic district in Brinkley, Arkansas that was listed on the National Register of Historic Places in 1992.

It includes the former Brinkley Union Station located at the site of the former crossing of the Rock Island and Cotton Belt railroads in Brinkley, Monroe County in eastern Arkansas. In addition to the Rock Island and Cotton Belt, the station also served branchline trains of the Missouri Pacific.

It also includes Rusher Hotel, also known as Great Southern Hotel.

History
Brinkley's Union Station was constructed in 1912 as a joint station to be utilized by all railroads passing through Brinkley. Cotton Belt passenger train service through Brinkley ended in 1959 and the last Rock Island passenger train stopped at Brinkley on November 10, 1967. Rock Island trackage west from Brinkley to near Little Rock was abandoned and dismantled in the mid-1980s.

Named passenger trains which stopped at Brinkley Union Station include:
 Choctaw Rocket
 Lone Star
 Morning Star

The station and nearby railroad hotel are listed on the National Register of Historic Places as Lick Skillet Railroad Work Station Historic District and Rusher Hotel.

Central Delta Depot Museum 
After sitting abandoned for a number of years, Brinkley Union Station has now been restored and is operated as the Central Delta Depot Museum, a local history museum run by the Central Delta Historical Society.  Exhibits focus on the natural, social, agricultural, and cultural history of the Arkansas Delta region.  Displays include railroad artifacts, mussel diving, jazz musician Louis Jordan, military artifacts, wildlife displays, household artifacts and local history.  The grounds include a train depot originally located in Monroe, Arkansas, a sharecropper’s house, and a Southern Pacific Railroad caboose.

References

External links 
 Monroe County Listings on the National Register of Historic Places

Railway stations on the National Register of Historic Places in Arkansas
Brinkley
B
Historic districts on the National Register of Historic Places in Arkansas
Union stations in the United States
Railroad museums in Arkansas
Museums in Monroe County, Arkansas
History museums in Arkansas
National Register of Historic Places in Monroe County, Arkansas
Former railway stations in Arkansas